James Fitzgerald (19 February 1874 – 20 August 1950) was an Australian cricketer. He played eight first-class matches for Queensland between 1902 and 1905.

See also
 List of Queensland first-class cricketers

References

External links
 

1874 births
1950 deaths
Australian cricketers
Queensland cricketers
Cricketers from Sydney